The India national cricket team toured England in 2004 for a three-match series of One Day Internationals in preparation for the 2004 ICC Champions Trophy. England won the series 2–1, winning the first two matches before India won the final match at Lord's.

Squads

ODI series

1st ODI

2nd ODI

3rd ODI

Further reading
 Playfair Cricket Annual
 Wisden Cricketers Almanack

References

External links
 Tour home at ESPNcricinfo

Cricket season
2004
International cricket competitions in 2004
2004 in English cricket
September 2004 sports events in the United Kingdom